Svenska Mission Kyrka I Sodre Maple Ridge  is a historic church in rural Maple Ridge Township, Minnesota, United States. The church is also known as Swedish Mission Church of South Maple Ridge.

The Swedish Mission Church of South Maple Ridge was established in 1884 by the Evangelical Covenant Church. The simple Gothic Revival church was constructed in 1897. The church building is no longer being used, but it is maintained by the Maple Ridge Cemetery Association. It was added to the National Register of Historic Places in 1980.

References

Related reading
Blanck, Dag  (April–July 2012) Two Churches, One Community: The Augustana Synod and the Covenant Church, 1860–1920 (Swedish-American Historical Quarterly) 
Granquist, Mark (April–July 2012) Parallel Paths: The Augustana Synod and the Covenant Church, 1920–1945 (Swedish-American Historical Quarterly)

Buildings and structures in Isanti County, Minnesota
Carpenter Gothic church buildings in Minnesota
Churches completed in 1897
Churches on the National Register of Historic Places in Minnesota
National Register of Historic Places in Isanti County, Minnesota
Swedish-American culture in Minnesota